The Minister of Foreign Affairs of the Republic of Slovenia (Slovene: Minister  za zunanje zadeve Republike Slovenije) is a senior official of the Government of Slovenia, and head of the Ministry of Foreign Affairs. He is, together with Prime Minister and President of the Republic, responsible for foreign policy and international relations of the Republic Slovenia.

The Foreign Minister is nominated by the Prime Minister-Designate and elected by the National Assembly of the Republic of Slovenia, following the hearing and confirmation by its Committee on Foreign Policy. Usually, but not always, Foreign Minister is also Deputy-Prime Minister, since the position is held by one of the government coalition partys' leaders.

Foreign Minister is member of the National Security Council and president of the Strategic Council for Foreign Affairs. Minister is also member of the EU bodies - Foreign and General Affairs Councils.

9th and current Minister of Foreign Affairs is Dr. Miro Cerar. He was elected and sworn in by the National Assembly on 13 September 2018. Cerar previously served as the Prime Minister, MP, National Assembly Adviser and Full Professor of Law at the University of Ljubljana, Faculty of Law. He is also one the authors of the 1991 Slovenian Constitution.

List of Ministers of Foreign Affairs

References

Government of Slovenia